Princess Friederike Caroline Luise of Hesse-Darmstadt (20 August 1752 – 22 May 1782) was a member of the House of Hesse and by marriage a Duchess of Mecklenburg-Strelitz.

She is the most recent common matrilineal ancestress (directly through women only) of Queen Margrethe II of Denmark, King Willem-Alexander of the Netherlands, King Albert II of Belgium, King Harald V of Norway and Grand Duke Henri of Luxembourg.

Life
Friederike was born in Darmstadt, the eldest daughter of Prince George William of Hesse-Darmstadt, second son of Louis VIII, Landgrave of Hesse-Darmstadt, and Countess Maria Louise Albertine of Leiningen-Falkenburg-Dagsburg.

She married Duke Charles of Mecklenburg-Strelitz on 18 September 1768 in Darmstadt. They had ten children together. Two daughters became queens consort as Louise would marry Frederick William III of Prussia and Frederica would marry Ernest Augustus, King of Hanover.

Friederike died of complications resulting from child birth in Hanover, where her husband was field marshal of the household brigade. After her death her husband married her younger sister Charlotte in 1784. In 1794 her husband succeeded to the throne of Mecklenburg-Strelitz as Charles II and in 1815 at the Congress of Vienna, he was raised to the title grand duke.

She died at the age of 29, three days after giving birth to her tenth child, Augusta, who lived just one day. Friederike is buried in the royal crypt of the church of St John the Baptist in Mirow.

Issue
Friederike had ten children between 1769 and 1782, six of whom survived to adulthood. Two of her daughters married royalty, Louise becoming Queen of Prussia and Frederica becoming Queen of Hanover.

Ancestry

References

1752 births
1782 deaths
House of Hesse-Darmstadt
House of Mecklenburg-Strelitz
Deaths in childbirth
Nobility from Darmstadt
Duchesses of Mecklenburg-Strelitz
Landgravines of Hesse-Darmstadt